The Official Secrets Act is M's second album, released in 1980 on Sire Records. The track "Official Secrets" was released as a single and charted in the UK at No. 64 in November 1980. The follow-up single was "Keep It To Yourself". The track "Maniac" featured Level 42 members Phil Gould on drums and Mark King on bass.

The album title is a reference to the various UK Official Secrets Acts.

Track listing

LP: MCF 3085

Side one
 "Transmission (The World Is at Your Fingertips)" – 4:30
 "Join the Party" – 3:39
 "Working for the Corporation" – 3:35
 "Your Country Needs You" – 3:20
 "M'aider" – 5:26

Side two
 "Relax" – 3:42
 "Maniac" – 3:22
 "Keep it to Yourself" – 3:34
 "Abracadabra" – 2:51
 "Official Secrets" – 6:03

1997 Westside CD Reissue: WESM 502
 "Transmission" – 4:30
 "Join the Party" – 3:39
 "Working for the Corporation" – 3:35
 "Your Country Needs You" – 3:20
 "Mayday" – 5:26
 "Relax" – 3:42
 "Maniac" – 3:22
 "Keep it to Yourself" – 3:34
 "Abracadabra" – 2:51 (1)
 "Official Secrets" – 6:03
 "Abracadabra (Sunset–Sunrise Mix) – 2:51
 "Danube" – 3:33 (1)
 "The Wedding Dance" – 3:37 (1)
 "Mambo La" – 2:29 (2)
 "Don't Believe What the Papers Say" – 1:12
 "The Bride of Fortune" – 4:20 (3)

All tracks written by Robin Scott except,
(1) "Abracadabra", "Danube" & "The Wedding Dance" written by Scott/Novik
(2) "Mambo La" written by Unknown
(3) "The Bride of Fortune" written by Scott/Westwood

Personnel
Robin Scott - vocals, guitar
Brigit Vinchon - vocals
David Vorhaus, Wally Badarou - synthesizer
Julian Scott - bass guitar
Philip Gould - drums
Mark King - guitar, drums; bass on "Maniac"
Gary Barnacle - saxophone
with:
Paddy Keenan - Uilleann pipes on "Keep It to Yourself"
Dónal Lunny - arrangement on "Keep It to Yourself"
Bill Whelan - arrangements on "Relax" and "Official Secrets"
The Dublin Symphony Orchestra - orchestra on "Relax" and "Official Secrets"; Audrey Parkes - leader
Billy Brown, Brigit Vinchon, Deidre Costello, Denis Blackham, Des Smith, John Keogh, Mog Aherne, Robin Scott - vocals and whistling on "Working for The Corporation"
Technical
Dave Aston, Denis Blackham, Philip Begley - engineer
Peter Ashworth - front cover photography

References

1980 albums
M (band) albums
MCA Records albums